Arundhati Nag (née Rao; born 1955/1956) is an Indian actress. She has been involved with multilingual Theatre in India, for over 25 years, first in Mumbai where she got involved with Indian People's Theatre Association (IPTA), and did various productions in Gujarati, Marathi, and Hindi theatre, and then in Kannada, Tamil, Malayalam and English, in Bangalore.

They stayed in Chintamani, Karnataka for a few years.

Following her marriage to Kannada actor-director Shankar Nag (1980–1990), her association with theatre continued in Bangalore, where she performed several plays in Kannada: Girish Karnad's Anju Mallige, 27 Mavalli Circle based on the famous play Wait Until Dark, Sandhya Chayya (Jayant Dalvi), Girish Karnad's Nagamandala, and Bertolt Brecht's Mother Courage as Hulaguru Huliyavva. She also worked in several Kannada movies: Accident (1984), Parameshi Prema Prasanga (1984) and Nodiswamy, Navirodu Heege (1987).<ref>Arundhati Nag Profile and Interview  mumbaitheatreguide.com.</ref>

Nag built a theatre space dedicated to quality theatre in Bangalore Ranga Shankara: . Frontline, Volume 21 – Issue 24, 20 November – 3 December 2004. She is a recipient of the Sangeet Natak Akademi Award (2008), the Padma Shri (2010) and the National Film Awards (57th) in 2010.

Career
Nag's career spans over 40 years of theatre, film and television. She is the founder and the Managing Trustee of the Sanket Trust, established in 1992, which runs Ranga Shankara, a theatre space in Bangalore.,.Ranga Shankara 
Ranga Shankara offers a quality theatre experience for theatre lovers in city.Arundhati Nag – Making The World See Her Dreams!  South Asian Women's Forum, 7 March 2005. 
The annual Ranga Shankara Theatre Festival, now in its twelfth year, has become a regular feature on Bangalore's cultural calendar.

Nag continues to be actively involved in theatre: her most recent works include Girish Karnad's "Bikhre Bimb" (Hindi) and "Odakalu Bimba" (Kannada).

Her last major movie was The Man Who Knew Infinity (2016), in which she played the mother of the mathematical wizard Ramanujan. She has also appeared in Hindi movies including Paa (2009), "Sapnay" (1997) and "Dil Se" (1998), Kannada movies including Golibar (1991), Jogi (2005)  and "Andar Bahar", and Malayalam Da Thadiya  (2012) and Drama (2018 film)

Personal life
Nag was born in 1956 in Delhi, stayed in Netaji Nagar. Her family moved to Mumbai when she was 10. At 17, she met Shankar Nag, also a theatre artist. Six years later, the two got married and moved to Bangalore. Shankar became a well-known film actor, and later a director, most remembered for his TV adaptation of R. K. Narayan's Malgudi Days (1987). They had a daughter together, Kaavya.

In 1990, Shankar died in a car accident. Arundhati continued to act in theatre, and began to work towards realising her dream of a theatre space, which in 2004, finally materialised into Ranga Shankara, which is today one of India's premier venues for theatre.

Filmography

Actor

Assistant director
 A Passage to India (1984)
 Indian Summer (1987)

Awards
  2008: Won: Sangeet Natak Akademi Award – Theatre, Acting
  2009: Won: 57th National Film Award for Best Supporting Actress – Paa  2010: Awarded: Padma Shri Award

References

External links

 
 Arundhati Nag: Life is beautiful – Interview Times of India''
 

Actresses from Bangalore
Actresses in Kannada cinema
Actresses in Tamil cinema
Indian film actresses
Indian stage actresses
Indian television actresses
Indian theatre directors
Living people
Recipients of the Sangeet Natak Akademi Award
Recipients of the Padma Shri in arts
Best Supporting Actress National Film Award winners
Screen Awards winners
1956 births
Indian women theatre directors
20th-century Indian actresses
21st-century Indian actresses
Actresses from Delhi
Actresses in Marathi theatre
Actresses in Malayalam theatre
Actresses in Kannada theatre
Actresses in Telugu theatre
Actresses in Malayalam cinema
Indian women film directors
20th-century Indian film directors
Film directors from Bangalore
Recipients of the Rajyotsava Award 2006